Nanli Township is a township in Qin County, Shanxi, China. , it has 19 villages under its administration:
Nanli Village
Xilin Village
Dongzhuang Village
Houjiazhuang Village
Shangzhangzhuang Village
Xiazhangzhuang Village
Meigou Village
Yangjiazhuang Village
Tang Village
Zhongli Village
Zhaojiagou Village
Yaojialing Village
Longmen Village
Beidishui Village
Mengjiazhuang Village
Shijiaotou Village
Getuo Village
Shihuo Village
Donglin Village

References 

Township-level divisions of Shanxi
Qin County